In network science, the configuration model is a method for generating random networks from a given degree sequence. It is widely used as a reference model for real-life social networks,  because it allows the modeler to incorporate arbitrary degree distributions.

Rationale for the model 
In the configuration model, the degree of each vertex is pre-defined, rather than having a probability distribution from which the given degree is chosen. As opposed to the Erdős–Rényi model, the degree sequence of the configuration model is not restricted to have a Poisson distribution, the model allows the user to give the network any desired degree distribution.

Algorithm 
The following algorithm describes the generation of the model:  
 Take a degree sequence, i. e. assign a degree to each vertex. The degrees of the vertices are represented as half-links or stubs. The sum of stubs must be even in order to be able to construct a graph. The degree sequence can be drawn from a theoretical distribution or it can represent a real network (determined from the adjacency matrix of the network).   
 Choose two stubs uniformly at random and connect them to form an edge. Choose another pair from the remaining  stubs and connect them. Continue until you run out of stubs. The result is a network with the pre-defined degree sequence. The realization of the network changes with the order in which the stubs are chosen, they might include cycles (b), self-loops (c) or multi-links (d) (Figure 1). Yet, the expected number of self-loops and multi-links goes to zero in the N → ∞ limit.

Self-loops, multi-edges and implications 
The algorithm described above matches any stubs with the same probability. The uniform distribution of the matching is an important property in terms of calculating other features of the generated networks. The network generation process does not exclude the event of generating a self-loop or a multi-link. If we designed the process where self-loops and multi-edges are not allowed, the matching of the stubs would not follow a uniform distribution. 

The expected total number of multi-links in a configuration model network would be:

where  is the n-th moment of the degree distribution.

A further consequence of self-loops and multi-edges is that not all possible networks are generated with the same probability. In general, all possible realizations can be generated by permuting the stubs of all vertices in every possible way. This would mean that each realization occurs with the same probability. However, self-loops and multi-edges can change the number of realizations, since permuting self-edges can result an unchanged realization.

Properties

Edge probability 
A stub of node  can be connected to  other stubs (there are  stubs altogether, and we have to exclude the one we are currently observing). The vertex  has  stubs to which node  can be connected with the same probability (because of the uniform distribution). Note that this formula does not apply to the case of self-edges.

Thus, a neighbor of a typical node is expected to have higher degree than the typical node itself. This feature of the configuration model describes well the phenomenon of "my friends having more friends than I do".

Clustering coefficient 
The clustering coefficient  (the average probability that the neighbors of a node are connected) is computed approximately as follows:

 

where  denotes the probability that a random edge reaches a degree- vertex, and the factors of the form "" rather than "" appear because one stub has been accounted for by the fact that these are neighbors of a common vertex. Evaluating the above results in

 

 

with  denoting the second moment of the degree distribution.

 

Thus, the clustering coefficient  becomes small in the  limit.

Giant component 
In the configuration model, a giant component (GC) exists if

 

That means that, the critical threshold solely depends on quantities which are uniquely determined by the degree distribution .

Configuration model generates locally tree-like networks, meaning that any local neighborhood in such a network takes the form of a tree. More precisely, if you start at any node in the network and form the set of all nodes at distance  or less from that starting node, the set will, with probability tending to 1 as n → ∞, take the form of a tree. In tree-like structures, the number of second neighbors averaged over the whole network, is: 

Then, in general, the average number at distance  can be written as:

 

This is famous as the Molloy-Reed criterion. The intuition behind this criterion is that if  the giant component (GC) exists, then the average degree of a randomly chosen vertex  in a connected component should be at least 2.

Diameter 
Configuration model can assume any degree distribution and shows the small-world effect, since to leading order the diameter of the configuration model is just .

Components of finite size 
As total number of vertices   tends to infinity, the probability to find two giant components is vanishing. This means that in the sparse regime, the model consist of one giant component (if any) and multiple connected components of finite size. The sizes of the connected components are characterized by their size distribution - the probability that a randomly sampled vertex belongs to a connected component of size  There is a correspondence between the degree distribution   and the size distribution  When total number of vertices tends to infinity, the following relation takes place:

 

where  and   denotes the -fold convolution power. The analytical expressions for these asymptotes depend on finiteness of the moments of  the degree distribution tail exponent  (when  features a heavy tail),  and the sign of Molloy–Reed criterium. The following table summarises these relationships (the constants are provided in).

Modelling

Comparison to real-world networks 
Three general properties of complex networks are heterogeneous degree distribution, short average path length and high clustering. Having the opportunity to define any arbitrary degree sequence, the first condition can be satisfied by design, but as shown above, the global clustering coefficient is an inverse function of the network size, so for large configuration networks, clustering tends to be small. This feature of the baseline model contradicts the known properties of empirical networks, but extensions of the model can solve this issue (see ). All the networks generated by this model are locally tree-like provided the average of the excess degree distribution is either constant or grows slower than the square root of number of links, . In other words, this model prevents forming substructures such as loops in the large size limit. Vanishing of clustering coefficient, is a special case of this more general result. While the tree-like property makes the model not very realistic, so many calculations, such as the generating function methods, are possible for the configuration model thanks to this feature.

Application: modularity calculation 
The configuration model is applied as benchmark in the calculation of network modularity. Modularity measures the degree of division of the network into modules. It is computed as follows:

Directed configuration model 

In the DCM (directed configuration model), each node is given a number of half-edges called tails and heads. Then tails and heads are matched uniformly at random to form directed edges.  The size of the giant component, the typical distance, and the diameter of DCM have been studied mathematically. 
There also has been extensive research on random walks on DCM.
Some real-world complex networks have been modelled by DCM, such as neural networks, finance and social networks.

References 

Networks